John Leiper (born 26 June 1938) is a Scottish former footballer who played as a goalkeeper.

Career
Born in Aberdeen, Leiper began his adult career with local Junior club Aberdeen East End. In 1961, he signed for Plymouth Argyle after being spotted by fellow Aberdonian and ex-Plymouth forward Jimmy Gauld. At Plymouth, Leiper was mainly utilised as a back-up, however he became first choice goalkeeper for the club in the 1965–66 season; a decision that lead to the resignation of manager Malcolm Allison after the club's directors favoured Leiper over Noel Dwyer in goal. In 1967, Leiper signed for Chelmsford City, staying with the club up until the 1969–70 season.

References

1938 births
Living people
Association football goalkeepers
Scottish footballers
Footballers from Aberdeen
Aberdeen East End F.C. players
Plymouth Argyle F.C. players
Chelmsford City F.C. players
English Football League players
Scottish Junior Football Association players